Brekalo is a Croatian surname. Notable people with the surname include:

 David Brekalo (born 1998), Slovenian footballer
 Filip Brekalo (born 2002), Croatian footballer
 Josip Brekalo (born 1998), Croatian footballer
 Marko Brekalo (born 1992), Croatian footballer
 Mirela Brekalo (born 1956), Croatian actress

See also
 

Croatian surnames